Youssouf Yacoub M'Changama (born 29 August 1990) is a professional footballer who plays as a midfielder for Ligue 1 club Auxerre. Born in France, he plays for the Comoros national team.

Club career
M'Changama joined Oldham Athletic on 5 March 2012. He made his Latics, and Football League, debut as a substitute against Yeovil Town five days later, on 10 March 2012, making him the first Comorian ever to play for the club.

In the 2021–22 season with Guingamp, M'Changama was included in the UNFP Ligue 2 Team of the Year, and won the award for the best goal of the season. He ended the campaign with nine goals and fifteen assists to his name. On 16 June 2022, it was confirmed that M'Changama had signed a two-year contract, with an option for a further year, with newly-promoted Ligue 1 side Auxerre.

International career 
Born in France, M'Changama is a player of the Comoros national team. On 24 January 2022, in a round of 16 match at the 2021 Africa Cup of Nations against hosts Cameroon, he scored a free kick in a 2–1 defeat.

Personal life
M'Changama's brother, Mohamed, is also a footballer.

Career statistics
Scores and results list Comoros goal tally first, score column indicates score after each M'Changama goal.

Honours
Individual
UNFP Ligue 2 Team of the Year: 2021–22

References

External links

 
 
 

1990 births
Living people
French sportspeople of Comorian descent
Citizens of Comoros through descent
Black French sportspeople
Footballers from Marseille
French footballers
Comorian footballers
Association football midfielders
Comoros international footballers
2021 Africa Cup of Nations players
Olympique de Marseille players
CS Sedan Ardennes players
ES Troyes AC players
Athlético Marseille players
Oldham Athletic A.F.C. players
RC Arbaâ players
Gazélec Ajaccio players
Grenoble Foot 38 players
En Avant Guingamp players
AJ Auxerre players
English Football League players
Algerian Ligue Professionnelle 1 players
Ligue 2 players
Ligue 1 players
Comorian expatriate footballers
French expatriate footballers
Expatriate footballers in England
Expatriate footballers in Algeria
Comorian expatriate sportspeople in England
Comorian expatriate sportspeople in Algeria
French expatriate sportspeople in England
French expatriate sportspeople in Algeria